Kuvakino is a rural locality (a village) in Nikolsky Selsoviet, Krasnokamsky District, Bashkortostan, Russia. The population was 202 as of 2010. There are 4 streets.

Geography 
Kuvakino is located 27 km northeast of Nikolo-Beryozovka (the district's administrative centre) by road. Nikolskoye is the nearest rural locality.

References 

Rural localities in Krasnokamsky District